Elachista klimeschiella is a moth of the family Elachistidae. It is found in France, Switzerland, Austria, Italy, the Czech Republic and Hungary.

References

klimeschiella
Moths described in 2002
Moths of Europe